Reminiscence is Bonnie Pink's first cover album released under the Warner Music Japan label on June 22, 2005.

Track listing

Charts

2005 albums
Bonnie Pink albums
Covers albums
Warner Music Japan albums